Luis T. Larco was a Peruvian politician in the early 1950s. He was the mayor of Lima from 1953 to 1955.

Mayors of Lima